Volvarina attenuata is a species of sea snail, a marine gastropod mollusk in the family Marginellidae, the margin snails.

Description

Distribution

References

 Gofas S. (1989). Le genre Volvarina (Marginellidae) dans la Méditerranée et l'Atlantique du Nord-Est. Bollettino Malacologico 25: 159–182, 25 fig page(s): 168-169

External links

Marginellidae
Gastropods described in 1865